Ozomelis is a small genus of flowering plants in the family Saxifragaceae, native to Alaska, western Canada and the western United States. It is probably sister to Heuchera.

Species
The following species are accepted:
Ozomelis diversifolia 
Ozomelis stauropetala 
Ozomelis trifida

References

Saxifragaceae
Saxifragaceae genera
Flora of Alaska
Flora of British Columbia
Flora of Alberta
Flora of the Northwestern United States
Flora of California
Flora of Utah